Victor Max Rapp (December 23, 1929 – October 24, 2016) was an American and Canadian football coach who served as the head coach of the BC Lions from 1977 to 1982.

Early career
Rapp was born in 1929 in Marionville, Missouri. A graduate of the University of Missouri, Rapp served as the Tigers end coach from 1967 to 1971. In 1972, he became the offensive coordinator of the Canadian Football League's Edmonton Eskimos. During his tenure in Edmonton, the Eskimos appeared in the Grey Cup four times; winning in 1975. Rapp left Edmonton in 1977 to become the receivers coach at Miami. Less than three weeks after accepting the Miami job, BC Lions general manager Bob Ackles hired Rapp to replace Cal Murphy as Lions head coach.

BC Lions
In his first season as Lions coach, Rapp led the Lions to a 10-6 record and was named the Canadian Football League's Coach of the Year. The Lions made the playoffs three times under Rapp but never advanced past the Western Final. After six seasons in Vancouver without a championship, Ackles felt that Rapp would not be able to lead the Lions to a championship and fired him.

Coaching record

Later career
After his firing, Rapp served as an assistant with the Houston Oilers, Los Angeles Rams, Tampa Bay Buccaneers, Detroit Lions, Chicago Bears, and Arizona Cardinals. He spent one season as a scout for the Philadelphia Eagles.

Rapp retired to Orlando, Florida. He died on October 24, 2016.

References

1929 births
2016 deaths
Arizona Cardinals coaches
BC Lions coaches
Chicago Bears coaches
Detroit Lions coaches
Edmonton Elks coaches
Houston Oilers coaches
Los Angeles Rams coaches
Missouri Tigers football coaches
Tampa Bay Buccaneers coaches
University of Missouri alumni
People from Marionville, Missouri